The 2001 LPGA Tour was the 52nd season since the LPGA Tour officially began in 1950. The season ran from January 12 to November 18. The season consisted of 38 official money events. Annika Sörenstam won the most tournaments, eight. She also led the money list with earnings of $2,105,868.

This was the first season that the Women's British Open was considered an LPGA major. There were seven first-time winners in 2001: Heather Daly-Donofrio, Wendy Doolan, Tina Fischer, Kate Golden, Carin Koch, Catriona Matthew, and Gloria Park.

The tournament results, leaders, and award winners are listed below.

Tournament results
The following table shows all the official money events for the 2001 season. "Date" is the ending date of the tournament. The numbers in parentheses after the winners' names are the number of wins they had on the tour up to and including that event. Majors are shown in bold.

^ – weather-shortened tournament

Leaders
Money List leaders

Full 2001 Official Money List

Awards

References

External links
LPGA Tour official site
2001 season coverage at golfobserver.com

LPGA Tour seasons
LPGA Tour